The  is a professional wrestling tag team championship owned by the New Japan Pro-Wrestling (NJPW) promotion. The title was introduced on August 8, 1998, at an NJPW live event. The IWGP Junior Heavyweight Tag Team Championship is one of two tag team titles contested for in NJPW; the IWGP Tag Team Championship is also sanctioned by NJPW. According to NJPW's official website, the Junior Heavyweight Tag Team Championship is listed as the "IWGP Jr. Tag Class", while the IWGP Tag Team Championship is considered the "IWGP Heavyweight Class". Being a professional wrestling championship, the title is won as a result of a predetermined outcome.

History
Title changes happen mostly at NJPW-promoted events. The Motor City Machine Guns (Alex Shelley and Chris Sabin), a Total Nonstop Action Wrestling (TNA) tag team, defeated then-champions No Limit (Tetsuya Naito and Yujiro) on January 4, 2009, at Wrestle Kingdom III. Their reign lasted until July 5, 2009, when they were defeated by Apollo 55 (Prince Devitt and Ryusuke Taguchi) at a live event. During that time, they had three successful defenses; two were held by TNA due to a pre-existing relationship and an agreement with NJPW. Their first defense in TNA, a rematch against No Limit, occurred on March 31, 2009, at the tapings of their weekly television program TNA Impact!. On April 19, 2009, they made their second, and last, defense in TNA at the Lockdown pay-per-view event in a Three Way Tornado Tag Team Six Sides of Steel cage match against No Limit and The Latin American Xchange (Hernandez and Homicide).

Reigns

Overall, there have been 70 reigns shared among 52 wrestlers, who made up 39 different teams. The inaugural champions were Shinjiro Otani and Tatsuhito Takaiwa, who defeated Dr. Wagner Jr. and Koji Kanemoto on August 8, 1998, in the final of a tournament.

Rocky Romero holds the record for most reigns by an individual wrestler, with eight. At seven reigns, The Young Bucks (Matt Jackson and Nick Jackson) hold the record for the most by a team. Gedo and Jado's combined four reign lengths add up to 960 days—the most of any team. They also hold the most total defenses as champions, with 15. Ryusuke Taguchi holds the records for most combined days and most total defenses by an individual wrestler, with 990 days and 17 defenses respectively across his 7 reigns with 4 different partners. Apollo 55 (Prince Devitt and Ryusuke Taguchi) hold the record for most defenses during a single reign, with 7.

At 348 days, Otani and Takaiwa's second reign is the longest in the title's history. Minoru and Prince Devitt's first reign is the shortest, at 21 days.

United Empire (Francesco Akira and TJP) are the current champions in their first reign. They won the titles by defeating Six or Nine (Ryusuke Taguchi and Master Wato) on June 20, 2022 during the New Japan Road tour.

References
General

Specific

External links
NJPW.co.jp

New Japan Pro-Wrestling championships
Tag team wrestling championships
Junior heavyweight wrestling championships
1998 establishments in Japan